Marjorie van de Bunt (born in Reeuwijk, 1 July 1968) is a Dutch Paralympian athlete competing in biathlon and cross-country skiing events.

Van de Bunt has had a handicap on her left arm since she was five years old. At the age of thirteen she started with cross-country skiing as well as biathlon.

She took part in three Winter Paralympic Games competing in the biathlon and cross-country skiing events. Over the course of her Paralympic career, she won a total of 10 medals. She retired from competition in 2002.

Winter Paralympic Games

Biathlon 

Source: www.paralympic.org

Cross Country Skiing 

Source: www.paralympic.org

References

External links
 

1968 births
Living people
Paralympic gold medalists for the Netherlands
Paralympic silver medalists for the Netherlands
Paralympic bronze medalists for the Netherlands
Dutch female biathletes
Dutch female cross-country skiers
Paralympic biathletes of the Netherlands
Paralympic cross-country skiers of the Netherlands
Biathletes at the 2002 Winter Paralympics
Biathletes at the 1998 Winter Paralympics
Biathletes at the 1994 Winter Paralympics
Cross-country skiers at the 2002 Winter Paralympics
Cross-country skiers at the 1998 Winter Paralympics
Cross-country skiers at the 1994 Winter Paralympics
Medalists at the 1994 Winter Paralympics
Medalists at the 1998 Winter Paralympics
Medalists at the 2002 Winter Paralympics
People from Reeuwijk
Paralympic medalists in biathlon
Paralympic medalists in cross-country skiing
Sportspeople from South Holland